Paraptica is a genus of moths belonging to the family Tineidae.

Species
Paraptica concinerata Meyrick, 1917 (from South Africa & Zambia)
Paraptica micraula (Gozmány, 2004) (from Namibia)

References
Meyrick E. 1917b. Descriptions of South African Microlepidoptera. - Annals of the South African Museum 17:1–21. Page: 15
De Prins, J. & De Prins, W. 2015. Afromoths, online database of Afrotropical moth species (Lepidoptera). World Wide Web electronic publication (www.afromoths.net) (acc.: 28-Nov.-2015)

Tineidae
Taxa named by Edward Meyrick
Tineidae genera